The Women's 4 x 7.5 kilometre biathlon relay competition at the 1998 Winter Olympics 19 February, at Nozawa Onsen. Each national team consisted of four members, with each skiing 7.5 kilometres and shooting twice, once prone and once standing.

At each shooting station, a competitor has eight shots to hit five targets; however, only five bullets are loaded in a magazine at one - if additional shots are required, the spare bullets must be loaded one at a time. If after the eight shots are taken, there are still targets not yet hit, the competitor must ski a 150-metre penalty loop.

Results

References

Women's biathlon at the 1998 Winter Olympics
Biath
Women's events at the 1998 Winter Olympics